Enorma massiliensis is a Gram-positive and obligately anaerobic bacterium from the genus of Enorma which has been isolated from human feces from Marseille in France.

References 

Actinomycetota
Coriobacteriaceae
Bacteria described in 2016